Marsak is a surname.
 Kyrylo Marsak (born 2004), Ukrainian figure skater
 Leonard Marsak (1924–2013), American historian

See also
 Marshak